Matthew Smyth is an Irish Gaelic footballer who plays with Na Cealla Beaga and also, formerly, for the Donegal county team.

Smyth made his senior debut for Donegal in the 2013 National Football League game against Kerry, an easy win in Ballybofey.

In April 2013, he injured his neck while playing in a league match against St Michael's.

He also played for Donegal Boston, winning the North-East Men's Senior Football Championship in 2015.

References

Year of birth missing (living people)
Living people
Donegal Boston Gaelic footballers
Donegal inter-county Gaelic footballers
Irish expatriate sportspeople in the United States
Killybegs Gaelic footballers